In Hindu mythology, Dhenuka, also known as Dhenukasura, is an asura (demon) killed by Balarama, the elder brother of Krishna.

The Harivamsa states that Dhenuka, with his host of attendant demons, all in the form of donkeys, as ruled over a forest of tala or palms trees, situated on the banks of the Yamuna River, north of mount Govardhana. Once, Balarama, Krishna and cowherds wandered into this forest, captivated by the fragrance of the fruits of the palm trees. When Krishna commented on the possible sweet taste of the fruit, Balarama shook the trees and the fruits fell on the ground. A jealous Dhenuka charged at Balarama, bit him and kicked with his hind legs. Balarama caught hold of Dhenuka's legs and whirled him towards a tree, shattering his chest, neck and waist as the tree fell with the demon. Balarama killed Dhenuka's demon attendants and set the forest open for the cowherds.

In Literature 
The Vishnu Purana also describes his legend:

See also
List of Asuras
Kaliya
Bakasura

Notes

References
 
 The Concise Srimad Bhagavatam
 Brahmapurāṇa
 The Purana Index

Danavas
People related to Krishna